Neil Lanctot (born 1966) is an American historian and author.

Biography
Lanctot was born in Woonsocket, Rhode Island.  He attended the University of Pennsylvania, graduating in 1987 with a B.A. in English.  He subsequently earned an M.A. in American History from Temple University in 1992 and a Ph.D. from the University of Delaware in 2002.

Lanctot's first book, Fair Dealing and Clean Playing: The Hilldale Club and the Development of Black Professional Baseball, 1910-1932, was published by McFarland and Company in 1994.  In 2007, Syracuse University Press released a paperback edition.

His second book, Negro League Baseball - The Rise and Ruin of a Black Institution, appeared in 2004 and received critical acclaim from numerous publications, including the front cover of the Sunday New York Times Book Review.

In March 2011, his third book, Campy - The Two Lives of Roy Campanella, was published by Simon & Schuster.   The book was the first to uncover the true story behind Roy Campanella's near fatal car accident in 1958 and his rocky relationship with Brooklyn Dodger great Jackie Robinson.   Campy received positive reviews from the Los Angeles Times, Publishers Weekly, Pittsburgh Post-Gazette, Baseball America, and several other publications upon its release.   It was also named an alternate Book of the Month Club selection. In a review of for The Washington Independent Review of Books, Bob Luke writes that "Lanctot brings to light a man whose life reached the highest highs and the lowest lows, telling well the story of a remarkable ball player whose career has not had the recognition it deserves. It’s an important story told with ease and authority."

In December 2015, Lanctot signed a deal with Riverhead, an Penguin Random House imprint, to publish his fourth book, which will explore America's path to involvement in World War I.  The book was published in late 2021 to critical acclaim.  Publishers Weekly wrote "Historian Lanctot (Campy: The Two Lives of Roy Campanella) delivers a fresh, character-driven look at the debate over America’s entry into WWI. He focuses on three “giants” of the Progressive Era, each of whom advocated a different course of action. Recognizing that most Americans didn’t want to get involved in European wars, President Woodrow Wilson established an official policy of neutrality in August 1914. Jane Addams, who enjoyed near-universal admiration for her innovative social welfare programs, promoted pacifism and organized an international peace conference in The Hague in April 1915. The following month, a German submarine sank the passenger ship Lusitania, killing 128 Americans. Support grew for the military preparedness advocated by former president Theodore Roosevelt, whose comeback bid (as nominee of the Progressive Party) against Wilson in the 1912 election had fallen short. After winning reelection in 1916, Wilson tried and failed to broker a peace deal, and finally asked Congress for a war declaration in April 1917. Lanctot smoothly toggles between his three main subjects and intriguing secondary characters including Hungarian suffragist and pacifist Rosika Schwimmer and American novelist James Norman Hall, who volunteered to fight with the British. The result is a rich and rewarding portrait of a crucial turning point in American history (https://www.publishersweekly.com/978-0-7352-1059-2).   

In April 2022, the American Society of Journalists and Authors selected The Approaching Storm as the best biography of 2021 (https://www.asja.org/what-we-do/awards/current-winners/).

Published works
Fair Dealing and Clean Playing - The Hilldale Club and the Development of Black Professional Baseball, 1910-1932 (1994)
Negro League Baseball - The Rise and Ruin of a Black Institution (2004)
Campy - The Two Lives of Roy Campanella (2011)
The Approaching Storm: Roosevelt, Wilson, Addams, and Their Clash Over America’s Future (2021)

Awards
2005: Seymour Medal (Society for American Baseball Research) for best baseball book, Negro League Baseball
2022: Best biography, 2021 - The American Society of Journalists and Authors.

References

External links
 Simon & Schuster website
Neil Lanctot - Historian, Writer official website
Neil Lanctot, author of Negro League Baseball: The Rise and Ruin of a Black Institution – Jerry Jazz Musician Interview discussing Negro League Baseball
 Interview with Ed Randall on WFAN

1966 births
Living people
American male journalists
Temple University alumni
21st-century American historians
21st-century American male writers
Baseball writers
University of Pennsylvania alumni
People from Woonsocket, Rhode Island
University of Delaware alumni
American male non-fiction writers
Historians from Rhode Island